Coliseo de Arecibo Manuel G. Iguina Reyes (English: Manuel Iguina Coliseum) is an indoor sporting arena located in Arecibo, Puerto Rico.  The capacity of the arena is 12,000 persons. The Coliseo Manuel Iguina is also known as Coliseo de Arecibo.  It is managed by Capitanes de Arecibo Interprise. It is the home of Capitanes de Arecibo basketball and volleyball team.
The basketball team is a member of Baloncesto Superior Nacional.

References

External links
 Facebook page

Buildings and structures in Arecibo, Puerto Rico
Indoor arenas in Puerto Rico
Basketball venues in Puerto Rico